The Calcinea are a subclass of the calcareous sponges. Its phylum is Porifera and class is Calcarea. Branching is usually dichotomous or umbellate with anastomoses, which gives rise to reticulate growths on stalks in adults. Most varieties are coral red or sulphur yellow.

References

 
Sponge subclasses